Decene  is an organic compound with the chemical formula . Decene contains a chain of ten carbon atoms with one double bond, making it an alkene. There are many isomers of decene depending on the position and geometry of the double bond.  Dec-1-ene is the only isomer of industrial importance. As an alpha olefin, it is used as a comonomer in copolymers and is an intermediate in the production of epoxides, amines, oxo alcohols, synthetic lubricants, synthetic fatty acids and alkylated aromatics.

The industrial processes used in the production of dec-1-ene are oligomerization of ethylene by the Ziegler process or by the cracking of petrochemical waxes.

In ethenolysis, methyl oleate, the methyl ester of oleic acid, converts to 1-decene and methyl 9-decenoate:

Dec-1-ene has been isolated from the leaves and rhizome of the plant Farfugium japonicum and has been detected as the initial product in the microbial degradation of n-decane.

References

External links
 

Alkenes